Citronellol, or dihydrogeraniol, is a natural acyclic monoterpenoid. Both enantiomers occur in nature. (+)-Citronellol, which is found in citronella oils, including Cymbopogon nardus (50%), is the more common isomer. (−)-Citronellol is widespread, but particularly abundant in the oils of rose (18–55%) and Pelargonium geraniums.

Preparation
Several million kilograms of citronellol are produced annually.  It is mainly obtained by hydrogenation of geraniol or nerol over copper chromite catalyst.  Homogeneous catalysts are used for the production of enantiomers.  

Citronellene is also a precursor.

Uses
Citronellol is used in perfumes and as a fragrance in cleaning products. In many applications, one of the enantiomers is preferred.  It is a component of citronella oil, an insect repellant.

Citronellol is used as a raw material for the production of rose oxide.  It is also a precursor to many commercial and potential fragrances such as citronellol acetate, citronellyl oxyacetaldehyde, citronellyl methyl acetal, and ethyl citronellyl oxalate.

Health and safety
The United States FDA considers citronellol as generally recognized as safe (GRAS) for food use. Citronellol is subject to restrictions on its use in perfumery, as some people may become sensitised to it, but the degree to which citronellol can cause an allergic reaction in humans is disputed.

In terms of dermal safety, citronellol has been evaluated as an insect repellent.

See also
 Citronellal
 Geraniol
 Rhodinol
 Pelargonium graveolens
 Perfume intolerance (allergy)

References

Perfume ingredients
Flavors
Monoterpenes
Alkenols